Everywhere at Once is the second studio album and major-label debut by American power pop band the Plimsouls, released in 1983 by Geffen Records. The album reached #186 on the Billboard albums chart.

Track listing
"Shaky City" (2:27)
"Magic Touch" (3:19)
"Oldest Story in the World" (3:19)
"Lie, Beg, Borrow, and Steal" (2:45)
"Play the Breaks" (4:17)
"How Long Will It Take?" (2:30)
"A Million Miles Away" (3:34)
"My Life Ain't Easy" (2:37)
"Inch By Inch" (2:35)
"I'll Get Lucky" (2:42)
"Everywhere at Once" (3:19)
"Hobo" (3:23) - 1992 remastered version bonus track

References

External links 
 

1983 albums
The Plimsouls albums
Albums produced by Jeff Eyrich